
Gmina Dubicze Cerkiewne is a rural gmina (administrative district) in Hajnówka County, Podlaskie Voivodeship, in north-eastern Poland, on the border with Belarus.

Villages
Gmina Dubicze Cerkiewne contains the villages and settlements of Czechy Orlańskie, Długi Bród, Dubicze Cerkiewne, Dubicze Tofiłowce, Górny Gród, Grabowiec, Istok, Jagodniki, Jakubowo, Jelonka, Jodłówka, Klakowo, Koryciski, Krągłe, Kraskowszczyzna, Nikiforowszczyzna, Pasieczniki Małe, Piaski, Rutka, Siemiwołoki, Stary Kornin, Starzyna, Werstok, Wiluki, Witowo, Wojnówka, Wygon and Zabagonie.

Neighbouring gminas
Gmina Dubicze Cerkiewne is bordered by the gminas of Czyże, Hajnówka, Kleszczele and Orla. It also borders Belarus.

References
 Polish official population figures 2006

Dubicze Cerkiewne
Hajnówka County